Baishan is a prefecture-level city in southeastern Jilin province, in the Dongbei (northeastern) part of China. "" literally means "White Mountain", and is named after Changbai Mountain (also known as Paektu Mountain). Baishan borders Yanbian to the east, Tonghua to the southwest, Jilin City to the north, and North Korea to the south.

Baishan is to be granted the title of China International Mineral Water City. In Baishan is the Baishan Dam.

History
In 1902, Qing imperial government set up the Linjiang County in today's Baishan region. During the Manchukuo period, Linjiang county was under the jurisdiction of Tonghua. In March 1959, Jilin provincial government promoted Linjiang County to a county-level city and renamed it as Hunjiang City, which is still under the administration of Tonghua Prefecture. In 1985, Hunjiang City developed into a prefecture-level city, administerring three districts and three counties including Fusong, Jingyu and Changbai. The city was renamed to Baishan in April, 1994 with the approval of the State Council.

Administrative divisions

Climate

Transportation
Changbaishan Airport

References

External links

Official website of Baishan Government

 
Cities in Jilin
Prefecture-level divisions of Jilin